The 2022 Clare Senior Hurling Championship was a competition in hurling that was the 127th staging of the Clare Senior Hurling Championship since its establishment by the Clare County Board in 1887.

The 2021 champions, and holders of the Canon Hamilton Cup are Ballyea who won their third title in six years, following on from their maiden success in 2016 and another in 2018. They defeated Inagh-Kilnamona by a single point in Cusack Park, Ennis in the county final.

The draws for the 2022 Clare club championships took place in April 2022.

Senior Championship Fixtures

Group stage
 Two groups of five and two groups of four.
 2021 semi-finalists are seeded and kept separate.
 Each team plays all the other teams in their group once. Two points are awarded for a win and one for a draw.
 The top two teams in each group advance to Quarter-Finals
 The third-placed teams in each group and the fourth-placed team in Groups A and B move to Senior B Championship
 The bottom-placed team from each group contest Relegation Playoffs

Group A

Group B

Group C

Group D

Quarter-finals
 Played by top two placed teams from each group

Semi-finals

County Final

Other Fixtures

Senior B Championship 
 Played by four third-placed teams from Groups A-D, and the fourth-placed teams from Groups A and B

Relegation Playoffs 
 Played by the four bottom-placed teams from Groups A-D
 Loser of each playoff relegated to Intermediate for 2023

References

External links

Clare Senior Hurling Championship
Clare Senior Hurling Championship